The Night Gardener is a 2006 crime novel by George Pelecanos. It is set in Washington, DC and focuses on homicide detective Gus Ramone, and ex-cops Dan "Doc" Holiday and TC Cook as they investigate the possible return of a serial killer.

The book was a finalist for the Los Angeles Times Book Prize for Mystery/Thriller.

Plot introduction
Set in the 1980s, a trio of murders is linked to a single suspect. All three victims have palindromic first names and are found shot through the head in community gardens. The media dubs the crimes the "palindrome murders". TC Cook was the lead investigator at the time, and two young officers, Gus Ramone and Doc Holiday, were with him at the third crime scene. 20 years later Cook is retired, and Holiday has left the police force. Ramone is a veteran homicide detective and becomes involved in a case which has all the hallmarks of a palindrome murder. Also realizing the similarities, the others are again drawn into the investigation.

Explanation of the novel's title
The perpetrator of the palindrome murders was nicknamed "The Night Gardener" by detectives.

Characters

Gus Ramone is a veteran of the homicide unit and a family man married to Regina, with two children, Diego and Alana. Gus is Italian-American while Regina is African-American. Regina works as a teacher, but when she met Gus she was a police officer. Diego's friends include Shaka Brown, Ronald and Richard Spriggs, and Asa Johnson. Their neighbours include Marita Bryant, and Asa's parents Terrance and Helena Johnson. Diego has recently changed schools and is often in trouble for minor infractions with the assistant principal Mr. Guy and principal Ms Brewster. His old principal, Ms. Cynthia Best, and teachers, Robert Bolton and Andrea Cummings, continue to work with his friends.

TC Cook is a retired homicide detective, lives alone, and is recovering from a stroke. He remains obsessed with the palindrome murders and his primary suspect Reginald Wilson.

Dan "Doc" Holiday is a bachelor, and since leaving the police has started a chauffeur and security firm. He left the police force under the cloud of impending morals charges being investigated by Ramone. Holiday is a regular at Leo Vazoulis' bar, and his drinking associates include salesman Jerry Fink, freelance writer Bradley West, and residential contractor Bob Bonano. Doc remains friends with officer James Ramirez.

Rhonda Willis, Ramone's partner, is a single mother and devout Christian.

The homicide squad includes detectives Paul "Bo" Green, Anthony Antonelli, Mike Bakalis, Eugene Hornsby, George Loomis, and Bill "Garloo" Wilkins. They work with Assistant U.S. Attorneys Margaret Healy and Ira Littleton. The squad is also working on the murder of Jacqueline Taylor; their main suspect is Tyree Williams. Rhonda is the primary on the murder of Jamal White. Her investigation includes his friend Leon Mayo, his girlfriend Darcia Johnson, and her roommate Shaylene Vaughn. Shaylene and Darcia work for a pimp called Dominique Lyons.

Crooks: Conrad Gaskins and Romeo Brock are stick-up men who make their living robbing drug dealers. Gaskins is a parolee and is dubious about his lifestyle. Brock is young, arrogant, and motivated entirely by the prospect of building his reputation. They use drug addict Ivan "Fishhead" Lewis for information. Fishhead is also a confidential informant for corrupt police officer Grady Dunne. Brock and Gaskins' next target is drug dealer Tommy Broadus. Broadus' girlfriend is named Chantel Richards. Broadus is supplied clandestinely by kingpin Raymond Benjamin. He uses drug mule Edward Reese to bring Broadus his supply. Reese is the son of Benjamin's sister, Raynella. Benjamin also employs enforcers Michael "Mikey" Tate and Ernest "Nesto" Henderson.

Plot

The novel opens in 1985 at the scene of the discovery of a third victim of the "Night Gardener" so called by the homicide investigators, and establishes Cook as the lead investigator with Ramone and Holiday as rookies. All three victims of the killer were found in community gardens, shot in the head after being similarly assaulted.

Twenty years later Holiday has left the force and Ramone has become a homicide detective. Ramone is working with his squad on the murder of Jacqueline Taylor. They manage to arrest and extract a confession from her boyfriend Tyree Williams which is backed by physical evidence. At home Ramone enjoys a happy family life and tries to mentor his son through the prejudices of his new school.

Holiday now works as a chauffeur, drinks in a bar and is unmotivated. One night after cruising, drinking and getting lost, Holiday falls asleep in his car near a community garden. He witnesses some events before sleeping again and awakes to find the body of Asa Johnson with a gunshot wound to the temple. Holiday makes an anonymous call to the police.

Bill "Garloo" Wilkins is the primary investigator on the Johnson case. Ramone becomes involved because of the boy's friendship with his son. He begins to notice similarities to the palindrome murders but says nothing. The Johnson family pressures Ramone to find a suspect. Evidence and the autopsy show a link with the palindrome murders. Wilkins uncovers evidence that Johnson was homosexual on his home computer. Ramone recognises Holiday's voice on the tape of the anonymous call and tracks him down.

Holiday also realises the similarity to the palindrome murders and contacts Cook. Now retired and afflicted by a small stroke, Cook continues to trail the early suspect Reginald Wilson. Wilson went to prison shortly after the last murder in the 80s and Cook still believes Wilson is the "Night Gardener". He is invigorated by the possibility of another chance to prove his theory and eagerly joins Holiday in an unofficial investigation.

Ramone arranges to meet with Cook and Holiday. Holiday is truthful about everything he saw on the night of Johnson's death and Cook tells Ramone about his suspicions over Wilson but it turns out that Wilson has an alibi for the night in question.

The night after the Johnson killing Ramone's partner, Rhonda Willis becomes the primary investigator on a new case, the murder of Jamal White. They find that the same gun was used in the deaths of White and Johnson. Through a tangled chain of connections detectives trace and arrest Aldan "Beano" Tinsley who, under pressure, confesses to finding the gun when walking through the gardens - after Asa Johnson shot himself.

Remembering the number of the patrol car from his night near the gardens, Holiday manages to identify the officer driving as Grady Dunne without Ramone's help. Ramone meets Holiday and tells him that Johnson's death was not related to the palindrome murders. Ramone convinces Holiday to identify Tinsley as the man he saw in the gardens on the night of Johnson's death in order to strengthen the White case because he abused Tinsley's rights in order to get the information he needed. Holiday is surprised to find that Ramone is not as straight as he believed.

Ramone returns to the gardens and finds Asa Johnson's journal hidden near where his body was found. He reads the diary in full and finds that Johnson had a relationship with a man who used the pseudonym "RoboMan". Ramone believes this was Johnson's math teacher Robert Bolton. Ramone resolves to trace the origins of the gun Johnson used, finding it belonged to Terrance Johnson which he remains quiet about. Instead he passes the information about the teacher on to the Morals Unit.

Holiday keeps the information about Johnson's suicide from Cook as he is worried it will demoralise him. Holiday and Cook follow Dunne to the gas station where Wilson works and are excited at the potential connection. They split up and Holiday confronts Dunne and realises that while he is corrupt he was not involved in Johnson's death.  Holiday resolves to tell Cook the truth. Cook follows Wilson and then goes to his home with plans to break in.  Cook approaches the house but becomes suddenly unwell and passes away in his car outside.

Holiday tells Ramone that Cook is missing and eventually finds his body. Holiday moves it to another location to avoid the press saying that Cook was still obsessed with the palindrome case.  Blaming himself for Cook's death, he resolves to break into Wilson's home himself. In an unrelated drug shootout, Dunne is on the take, and in the melee, Brock, Benjamin and Dunne are killed and Henderson flees.

The novel closes with a return to 1985 and the revelation that Wilson was responsible for the palindrome murders, hiding trophies from each victim in his record collection.

Major themes 

Pelecanos has stated that family is a major theme in the novel.

Critical reception 
The book received very good reviews from critics. The review aggregator Metacritic reported the book had an average score of 90 out of 100, based on 18 reviews.

References 

2006 American novels
Novels by George Pelecanos
Barry Award-winning works
Novels set in Washington, D.C.
Fiction set in the 1980s
Little, Brown and Company books